Tali Darsigny (born 8 March 1998) is a Canadian weightlifter.

She has represented Canada at the Commonwealth Games in 2018 and 2022, the Pan American Games in 2019 and the Summer Olympics in 2021.

Career
Darsigny competed in the 2017 World Weightlifting Championships, coming in ninth in the Women's 58 kg event.

She competed in the 2018 Commonwealth Games where she won a silver medal in the Women's 58 kg event with a combined total of 200 kg. She also competed at the 2019 Pan American Games.

In June 2021, Darsigny was named to Canada's Olympic team. She finished in 9th place in the women's 59 kg event.

She won a bronze medal at the 2022 Commonwealth Games in the Women's 59 kg event.

Personal life
She is the daughter of weightlifter Yvan Darsigny. She is also the sister of Shad Darsigny.

References

External links
 

1998 births
Living people
Canadian female weightlifters
Commonwealth Games medallists in weightlifting
Commonwealth Games silver medallists for Canada
Commonwealth Games bronze medallists for Canada
Weightlifters at the 2018 Commonwealth Games
Weightlifters at the 2022 Commonwealth Games
Weightlifters at the 2019 Pan American Games
Pan American Games competitors for Canada
Weightlifters at the 2020 Summer Olympics
Olympic weightlifters of Canada
21st-century Canadian women
Sportspeople from Saint-Hyacinthe
Medallists at the 2018 Commonwealth Games
Medallists at the 2022 Commonwealth Games